Rørvik Church was a parish church of the Church of Norway in Vikna municipality in Trøndelag county, Norway. It is located in the town of Rørvik on the island of Inner-Vikna. It was one of the churches for the Vikna parish which is part of the Namdal prosti (deanery) in the Diocese of Nidaros. The modern, concrete and glass church was built in a long church design in 2019 using plans drawn up by the architect Ogmund Sørli. The church seats about 250 people, but can be expanded up to about 400 people.

History
The government agreed and it was built. The new church was consecrated on 27 October 1896 by Bishop Johannes Skaar. The white, wooden church was built in a long church style in 1896 by the architects Ole Scheistrøen and Arne Sjølvik. The church seated about 200 people.

On 1 May 1940, during World War II, a bomb was dropped on the hill between the church and the road Johan Bergs gate. The church was so badly damaged that it could not be used without a thorough repair. The church was then rebuilt, but to save money and time, a somewhat simpler design was chosen rather than replicating the original.  It was restored in 1973 and 2006-2007.

On 18 February 2013, the church was damaged by fire, but survived. The altarpiece was brought to safety during the firefighting.  It is likely that the fire was started by two children who were playing with matches. The fire was declared accidental. After removing the silver and remaining historic pieces, the church was demolished in preparation for construction of a new church building.

After a long design and fundraising period, construction on the new church began in October 2018. The new glass and concrete building was completed in 2019 and it was consecrate on 22 December 2019 by the Bishop Herborg Finnset.

Media gallery

See also
List of churches in Nidaros

References

Nærøysund
Churches in Trøndelag
Long churches in Norway
Concrete churches in Norway
21st-century Church of Norway church buildings
Churches completed in 2019
1896 establishments in Norway